Bueng Bun is a district (amphoe) of Sisaket province, northeastern Thailand.

History
The minor district (king amphoe) was created on 18 July 1977, when the four tambons, Po, Dot, Siao, and Nong Ma were split off from Uthumphon Phisai district. In 1979 all sub-districts except Po were returned to Uthumphon Phisai. The minor district was upgraded to a full district on 4 July 1994.

Geography
Neighboring districts are (from the north clockwise): Rasi Salai, Uthumphon Phisai, and Pho Si Suwan of Sisaket Province, and Rattanaburi of Surin province.

Administration
The district is divided into two sub-districts (tambons), which are further subdivided into 25 villages (mubans). Bueng Bun is a township (thesaban tambon) which covers parts of both tambon. There is one further tambon administrative organization (TAO).

References

External links
amphoe.com

Bueng Bun